Rossmaessleria  is a genus of land snails in the subfamily Helicinae of the family  Helicidae.

Distribution
This genus of snail is native to northwestern Africa and southwestern Europe.

Anatomy
These snails create and shoot love darts as part of their courtship and mating behavior.

Species
Species within the genus Rossmaessleria  include:
 Rossmaessleria boettgeri (Kobelt, 1881)
 Rossmaessleria galindoae Torres & Ahuir Galindo, 2011
 Rossmaessleria homadensis (Rutllant, 1974)
 Rossmaessleria keltiensis Galindo, 2017
 Rossmaessleria kucerai Galindo, 2017
 Rossmaessleria marocana Galindo, 2017
 Rossmaessleria scherzeri (L. Pfeiffer & Zelebor, 1867)
 Rossmaessleria sicanoides (Kobelt, 1881)
 Rossmaessleria subcabriuscula (Böttger)
 Rossmaessleria sultana (P.M.A. Morelet, 1880)
 Rossmaessleria tetuanensis (Kobelt)
 Rossmaessleria tistutensis (Rutllant)
 Rossmaessleria weberi (Kobelt, 1881)
Species brought into synonymy
 Rossmaessleria anticana Pallary, 1928: synonym of Rossmaessleria scherzeri fichtalana (Pallary, 1919) (original combination)
 Rossmaessleria vondeli Pallary, 1928: synonym of Loxana beaumieri (Mousson, 1873) (original combination)

References

 Bank, R. A. (2017). Classification of the Recent terrestrial Gastropoda of the World. Last update: July 16, 2017.

Helicidae
Gastropod genera